The Kannada Chalavali Vatal Paksha, which the literally means, Kannada Movement Vatal Party and abbreviated as the, KCVP, is an Indian state political party in the Karnataka. this party led by Vatal Nagaraj.

References 

Registered unrecognised political parties in India